Charlie Robert Martin Lee-Kelman (born November 2, 2001) is an American professional soccer player who plays as a forward for Leyton Orient, on loan from EFL Championship club Queens Park Rangers.

Club career

Southend United 
Kelman scored 61 goals at youth level for Southend United in the 2017–18 season. He made his professional debut for Southend in a League One match against Plymouth Argyle on 12 January 2019. He also scored his first professional goal in that match, finding the net from inside his own half in the second minute of stoppage time at the end despite Southend United losing 3–2. Kelman played in 10 games and scored one goal in his first full season as a professional with Southend. In his second season playing for Southend's first team, Kelman played in 18 games and was Southend's leading scorer in League One with five goals. In his last season with Southend, Kelman made two appearances in EFL League Two before transferring to Queens Park Rangers before the end of the summer transfer window.

Queens Park Rangers 
On October 14, 2020, Kelman joined Queens Park Rangers on a three-year deal for an undisclosed fee.

Loans to Gillingham 
On August 31, 2021, Kelman joined Gillingham on a season-long loan. He returned however to his parent club in November due to frustrations about a lack of playing time. On 14 January 2022, with previous manager Steve Evans having left the club, Kelman returned to Gillingham for the remainder of the season.

Leyton Orient (loan)
On July 25, 2022, Kelman signed for League Two club Leyton Orient on a season-long loan deal.

International career
Kelman is eligible to represent England and the United States. He spent much of his youth in Texas, including time in the setup of FC Dallas, before moving back to England. He has represented the United States at the under-18 and under-20 levels.

Personal life
Kelman attended The Bromfords School in Wickford alongside former Southend teammate Matt Rush.

Career statistics

References

External links 
 
 Soccerway profile

2001 births
Living people
Sportspeople from Essex
Citizens of the United States through descent
American soccer players
United States men's youth international soccer players
English footballers
English emigrants to the United States
Association football forwards
Southend United F.C. players
Queens Park Rangers F.C. players
Gillingham F.C. players
Leyton Orient F.C. players
English Football League players
English people of American descent
Sportspeople of American descent